Acaromimus is a genus of fungus weevils in the beetle family Anthribidae. There are at least two described species in Acaromimus.

Species
These two species belong to the genus Acaromimus:
 Acaromimus americanus (Motschulsky, 1873)
 Acaromimus sharpi Jordan, 1906

References

Further reading

 
 

Anthribidae
Articles created by Qbugbot